The boys combined competition of the alpine skiing events at the 2016 Winter Youth Olympics was held at the Hafjell Olympic Slope near Lillehammer, Norway, on 14 February. 53 athletes from 45 different countries took part in this event.

Results
The race was started at 11:00.

References

Alpine skiing at the 2016 Winter Youth Olympics